Bakhshayesh (also Romanized as Bakhshāyesh, Bakhshaish, and Bekhshayesh) is a city in the Central District of Heris County, East Azerbaijan province, Iran. At the 2006 census, its population was 5,752 in 1,386 households. The following census in 2011 counted 6,098 people in 1,677 households. The latest census in 2016 showed a population of 6,102 people in 1,801 households.

Notable people 
 Abd al-Rahim Aqiqi Bakhshayishi, (1942 – 5 April 2012) Islamic religious writer, journalist and translator.

See also
Bakshaish rugs and carpets

References 

Heris County

Cities in East Azerbaijan Province

Populated places in East Azerbaijan Province

Populated places in Heris County